South Strafford is an unincorporated village in the town of Strafford, Orange County, Vermont, United States. South Strafford has a post office with ZIP code 05070.

References

Unincorporated communities in Orange County, Vermont
Unincorporated communities in Vermont